U Soe Myat Min (born 19 May 1982) is a former Burmese footballer. He played for the Myanmar national team and spent the majority of his club career at Kanbawza. Making his debut for the national team since 1998, he was made captain for the 2002 Tiger Cup.

Soe Myat Min also played a key role for Myanmar at the Tiger Cup, helping them qualify for the semi-finals. He himself finished the tournament as joint second top scorer of the tournament with six goals and was included in the tournament's best XI.

He also helped Myanmar win their fourth Merdeka Cup Championship in 2006 and was named Most Valuable Player of the tournament. Soe Myat Min was injured during training for the 2007 Asean Football Championships, and did not play in the group matches. Myanmar did not qualify for the semi-finals.

The Burmese star was also featured in the 2008 AFC Challenge Cup and scored a goal against Nepal.

Soe Myat Min helped Myanmar win the 2008 Myanmar Grand Royal Challenge Cup. by scoring a hat-trick against Malaysia in the semi-finals and both goals in the 2–1 win over Indonesia in the final. Soe Myat Min became the selected player of the Myanmar U-16 soccer team in 1998. He played over 60 international matches, scoring 19 goals for the country. Soe Myat Min is also the all time top scorer of Myanmar as of the Myanmar Football Federation.

International goals

References 

1982 births
Living people
Burmese footballers
Myanmar international footballers
Sportspeople from Yangon
Kanbawza F.C. players
Association football forwards
Southeast Asian Games bronze medalists for Myanmar
Southeast Asian Games medalists in football
Competitors at the 2001 Southeast Asian Games